Upshot–Knothole Annie was a nuclear weapons test conducted by the United States as part of Operation Upshot–Knothole. It took place at the Nevada Test Site on 17 March 1953, and was nationally televised. The live TV coverage was recorded on a kinescope, so it is a rare record of the sound an actual atomic bomb makes.

Operation Doorstep was a civil defense study conducted by the Federal Civil Defense Administration in conjunction with Annie. It studied the effect of the nuclear blast on two wooden frame houses, fifty automobiles and eight bomb shelters designed for residential use.

The administration concluded that a car would be "relatively safe" from a small nuclear bomb at least ten blocks away if windows were left open to prevent the car collapsing on its occupants. The homes in the study were constructed in such a way as to minimize the thermal effects of Annie, with an eye towards determining if, in the absence of fire, the basement of the closer home —  from the hypocenter — might shelter its occupants, while the second — at  — could remain standing. Both homes performed as expected under the conditions of their construction.

References

Explosions in 1953
Upshot-Knothole
1953 in military history
Nevada Test Site nuclear explosive tests
March 1953 events in the United States